Álvaro Corrada del Río, S.J. (born May 13, 1942) is a Puerto Rican-born American prelate of the Catholic Church and member of the Society of Jesus who currently serves as the apostolic administrator of the Diocese of Arecibo in Puerto Rico.

Corrada served as the bishop of the Diocese of Mayagüez in Puerto Rico from 2011 until his retirement in 2020. He previously served as bishop of the Diocese of Tyler in Texas from 2001 to 2011, as apostolic administrator of the Diocese of Caguas in Puerto Rico from 1997 to 2001 and as an auxiliary bishop of the Archdiocese of Washington D.C. from 1985 to 1997

Biography

Early life
Álvaro Corrada was born on May 13, 1942, in the Santurce section of San Juan, Puerto Rico. He has an older brother, Baltasar Corrada del Río, who served as Mayor of San Juan. After attending the local public schools, Álvaro Corrada entered the minor seminary of what was then the Diocese of San Juan in 1955. 

In 1960, Corrada entered the Society of Jesus at their novitiate in Poughkeepsie, New York. After completing his initial period of formation and professing his initial religious vows to the Jesuits, he studied at Fordham University in Bronx, New York, and later Woodstock College in Woodstock, Maryland.

Priesthood 
Corrada was ordained to the priesthood for the Society of Jesus by Bishop Miguel Rodriguez on July 6, 1974. After his ordination, Corrada went to Paris to study at the Catholic Institute of Paris.  

After returning to the United States, Corrada he was assigned as the director of spiritual retreats at Mount Manresa Retreat House on Staten Island, New York. Following that assignment, he served as an assistant pastor at the Jesuit-run Nativity Parish on the Lower East Side of Manhattan (1980–1983).  In 1983, Corrada was appointed director of the Northeast Pastoral Center for Hispanics in Manhattan.

Auxiliary Bishop of Washington
On May 31, 1985, Corrada was appointed as an auxiliary bishop of the Archdiocese of Washington, D.C. and titular bishop of Rusticiana, by Pope John Paul II. Corrada selected as his episcopal motto: Neminem nisi Iesum (No one but Jesus).

Corrada was named apostolic administrator of the Diocese of Caguas in Puerto Rico as an additional responsibility on July 5, 1997.

Bishop of Tyler
Corrada was appointed by John Paul II as the third bishop of the Diocese of Tyler on December 5, 2000, and was installed on January 30, 2001.

Bishop of Mayagüez
Corrada was appointed by Pope Benedict XVI as bishop of the Diocese of Mayagüez on July 6, 2011; he was installed September 12 2011.  On May 9, 2020, Pope Francis accepted his Corrada's resignation as bishop of Mayagüez after he reached the age of 75.In March 2022, Francis appointed Corrada as the apostolic administrator of the Diocese of Arecibo.

Viewpoints

Tridentine Mass 
Corrada was one of the earliest proponents of the Tridentine Mass. Before the issuance of the apostolic letter, Summorum Pontificum by Pope Benedict, he was singled out in an article in The Wanderer as one of the few American bishops "...who have been generous in the Ecclesia Dei indult application, as requested and emphasized repeatedly by the late Pope John Paul II."

See also
 

 Catholic Church hierarchy
 Catholic Church in the United States
 Historical list of the Catholic bishops of Puerto Rico
 Historical list of the Catholic bishops of the United States
 List of Catholic bishops of the United States
 Lists of patriarchs, archbishops, and bishops

References

External links 

Roman Catholic Diocese of Mayaguez (Official Site in Spanish)

Episcopal succession

1942 births
Living people
Religious leaders from Texas
People from Santurce, Puerto Rico
Puerto Rican Jesuits
20th-century American Jesuits
21st-century American Jesuits
Fordham University alumni
20th-century Roman Catholic bishops in Puerto Rico
21st-century Roman Catholic bishops in Puerto Rico
Jesuit bishops
Roman Catholic bishops of Mayaguez